Ken P. Chong ( is a Research Professor at The George Washington University and a former associate at the National Institute of Science and Technology (NIST). He was the Engineering Advisor, Interim Division Director and program director of Mechanics and Materials at various times for 21 years at the U.S. National Science Foundation. He has published over 200 refereed papers, and is the author or coauthor of twelve books including "Elasticity in Engineering Mechanics", "Intelligent Structures", "Modeling and Simulation-Based Life Cycle Engineering", "Mechanics of Oil Shale", and "Materials for the New Millennium". He has taught at the University of Wyoming, University of Hong Kong, University of Houston, and George Washington University [www.gwu.edu/] and had been visiting professor at MIT and University of Washington. Listed in Stanford University top 2% of scientists globally, Oct. 2022 

Chong grew up and obtained high school education at the Queen Elizabeth School, Hong Kong. He pursued higher education for the B.S. degree in Civil Engineering with major in Structures at the Taiwan National Cheng Kung University, and M.S. degree for Structural Mechanics at the University of Massachusetts Amherst. He also obtained advanced degrees at Princeton University: M.A., M.S. in Engineering, and completed the Ph.D. in Mechanics, 1969. After that he received post-doctoral management training at the Federal Executive Institute, for senior federal executives, Class 221, 1996. He received an Honorary Doctorate from Shanghai University [www.shu.edu.cn] in 2004.

His biographical profile is cited in the American Men and Women of Science and in 2008 he was elected a Fellow of the American Society of Mechanical Engineers (ASME). He is also a fellow of AAM , SEM  and ASCE. as well as a distinguished member of ASCE. He was a visiting professor at MIT in 1988 and University of Washington in 1987. He is a visiting professor at Tsinghua University ; an honorary professor in 1981 at the University of Hong Kong  as well as the 49th honorary professor at the Harbin Institute of Technology from 2013 .

In the 1970’s Professor Chong pioneered the analysis and development of re-usable, energy and structural efficient sandwich panels with cold-formed steel facings and rigid foamed cores, now widely used in industrial and commercial building systems [Chong, K. P., and Hartsock, J. A., "Structural Analysis and Design of Sandwich Panels with Cold-Formed Steel Facings", Thin-Walled Structures Journal, W. W. Yu and J. Rhodes (eds), Vol. 16 (1993) 199-218].  He also developed new semi-circular fracture specimens for core-based brittle materials [Chong, K. and M. Kuruppu (1984). "New specimen for fracture toughness determination for rock and other materials." International Journal of Fracture 26(2): R59-R62.], now used around the world, widely cited, is now a standard [ASTM D8044-16 Standard Test Method for Evaluation of Asphalt Mixture Cracking Resistance using the Semi-Circular Bend Test (SCB) at Intermediate Temperatures; ISRM-Suggested Method for Determining the Mode I Static Fracture Toughness Using Semi-Circular Bend Specimen, Rock Mechanics and Rock Engineering 47(1):267-274 • December 2013].  His research on the design of hybrid girders [Chong, K. P., "Simplified Method for the Flexural Design of Stiffened Hybrid Girders," AISC Engineering Journal, Vol. 13, No. 1, spring, 1976, pp. 18–19]has been incorporated into AISC manuals. His seminal experimental research on sweet spots in the 70’s [Chang, B., Chong, K. P., and Melo, A., "Sweet Spot of Tennis Rackets Based on  Testing," presented at the Society for Experimental Stress Analysis Spring Meeting, Wichita, KS, May 1978, Paper no. CR-7, 14 pp., funded by AMF Head Corp.] changed the design of tennis and other rackets. At the University of Wyoming, he has been the principal investigator of 20 plus federally funded research projects [from NSF, DOD, DOE, DOI, etc], mostly on mechanics of solids. Currently he is working on smart materials, cloaking of seismic waves and other projects.

He was a co-founder and honorary editor of the Journal of Smart & Nano Materials and Editor of the CRC Press book series Structural Engineering: Mechanics and Design. He has been involved in the planning of the new Hong Kong University of Science and Technology [www.ust.hk/] in 1988-89. Since 2011 he has been serving on engineering panels at Hong Kong Research Grants Council'. He has also been working as an expert panelist with the Hong Kong University Grants Committee' and the Innovation and Technology Commission'.

He received numerous awards and honors, including the 1997 ASCE Edmund Friedman Professional Recognition Award ; Distinguished Member, ASCE ; NCKU Distinguished Alumnus Award ; ASME 2011 Ted Belytschko Applied Mechanics Award  for “significant contributions in the practice of engineering mechanics”, and the NSF highest Distinguished Service Award  for “his exemplary direction of the Mechanics Program and for his role in nurturing the emerging field of nanomechanics, including his planning, encouragement, and support of the NSF Nanomechanics (and Materials)  Summer Institute”. He delivered the Mindlin Lecture  at Columbia University in 2005, the Sadowsky Lecture  at RPI in 2006, the Raouf Lecture   at the US Naval Academy in 2012, the ASME Thurston Lecture  in 2014, and the Distinguished Lecture  at the University of Macau in 2015.

References

External links
Dr. Chong's Curriculum Vitae

National Cheng Kung University alumni
George Washington University faculty
1942 births
Living people